Pescador Island is an island located in the Tañon Strait, a few kilometres from the western coast of the island of Cebu in the Philippines. It is part of the municipality of Moalboal.

The island derives its name from the Philippines' Spanish colonial heritage and the abundance of fish living on the surrounding coral reef, and the many fishermen that fish them ("pescador" translates from Spanish to "fisherman"). The rich marine life also attracts recreational divers from the many dive operations in nearby Panagsama.

On the west side of the island, an open-top underwater cave nicknamed 'the Cathedral' can be found. Most recreational dive tours start at the island's south end, and let the divers drift with the current either along the east or the west side of the island. The island itself has a lighthouse and access steps on the north and east sides.

The warm waters of the Philippines harbour a very rich marine life, with over 2,500 species of fish, and many of these are also found around Pescador island, contributing to the island being so popular with recreational divers. A rather more unusual part of the Pescador island biodiversity is the large school of sardines that have made the relative sanctuary of the reef its home. After an earthquake in February 2012, the school left the island, affecting the population of larger predatory fish. However, in May 2013 the school returned and so did the bigger fish. Sightings of sharks have also been reported.

In 1990, the Sangguniang Bayan of Moalboal has declared Pescador Island as a marine park and fish sanctuary. Since it is a marine park, dive shops are required to pay a fee for each diver they bring to the island. Proceeds from entrance fees are managed by the Municipality of Moalboal and Moalboal Dive Center Association (MDCA) towards the finance of a number of conservation programs in the municipality. These programs include patrols and enforcement to abolish destructive fishing, village improvement programs, collection and disposal of plastic and other wastes entering the local waters, marine conservation education of village children and adults, and reef and mangrove rehabilitation.

References

Sources

External links
 

Tourist attractions in Cebu
Underwater diving sites in the Philippines
Islands of Cebu